Aotearoa is an AC72 class catamaran of Emirates Team New Zealand that unsuccessfully challenged for the 2013 America's Cup. It was built for Emirates Team New Zealand for the 2013 Louis Vuitton Cup.

Career
Aotearoa lost to Oracle Team USA 17 of Oracle Team USA by 8–9 in the 2013 America's Cup. Aotearoa had the highest measured speed in the competition,

References

AC72 yachts
America's Cup challengers
2010s sailing yachts
Sailing yachts built in New Zealand
Sailing yachts of New Zealand
Louis Vuitton Cup yachts
Individual catamarans
2013 America's Cup